Raymond Smiley Springer (April 26, 1882 – August 28, 1947) was an American attorney and jurist who served as a member of the U.S. House of Representatives from Indiana from 1939 to 1947.

Biography 
Born on a farm in Rush County, near Dunreith, Indiana, Springer attended the public schools, Earlham College, Richmond, Indiana, and Butler University, Indianapolis, Indiana.
He was graduated from the Indiana Law School at Indianapolis in 1904.
He was admitted to the bar in 1904 and commenced practice in Connersville, Indiana.
County attorney of Fayette County, Indiana from 1908 to 1914.

He served as judge of the thirty-seventh judicial circuit of Indiana 1916-1922.

During the First World War served as a captain of Infantry, Eighty-fourth Division, in 1918.
He served as lieutenant colonel of the Officers' Reserve Corps 1918-1946. He was an unsuccessful candidate for Governor of Indiana in 1932 and 1936.

Congress 
Springer was elected as a Republican to the Seventy-sixth and to the four succeeding Congresses and served from January 3, 1939, until his death in Connersville, Indiana, August 28, 1947. He was interred in Dale Cemetery.

See also
 List of United States Congress members who died in office (1900–49)

References

External links 
 

1882 births
1947 deaths
Earlham College alumni
Butler University alumni
United States Army officers
People from Rush County, Indiana
People from Connersville, Indiana
20th-century American politicians
Republican Party members of the United States House of Representatives from Indiana